Macha Alexandra van der Vaart (born 17 April 1972 in Alkmaar, North Holland) is a former field hockey midfielder from the Netherlands, who played 151 international matches for the Dutch National Women's Team, in which she scored seventeen goals. She made her debut on December 9, 1998 against Australia (1-1), and was a member of the team, that won bronze at the 2000 Summer Olympics and silver at the 2004 Summer Olympics. She retired from international competition after the Athens Games.

External links
 
 Dutch Hockey Federation

1972 births
Field hockey players at the 2000 Summer Olympics
Field hockey players at the 2004 Summer Olympics
Dutch female field hockey players
Living people
Olympic field hockey players of the Netherlands
Olympic bronze medalists for the Netherlands
Olympic silver medalists for the Netherlands
Sportspeople from Alkmaar
Olympic medalists in field hockey
Medalists at the 2000 Summer Olympics
Medalists at the 2004 Summer Olympics
HC Bloemendaal players